Austromitra decresca is a species of sea snail, a marine gastropod mollusk, in the family Costellariidae, the ribbed miters.

Distribution
This marine species occurs off Southeast Brazil

References

decresca